The Aragonese Football Federation (FAF) is the governing body of the sport of football in Aragon, Spain. The FAF organises Group 17 of the Tercera División, with the assistance of the Royal Spanish Football Federation (RFEF), as part of the Spanish football league system. It also organises the regional divisions.

Competitions
 Men's
 Tercera División (Group 17)
 Regional Preferente
 Primera Regional
 Segunda Regional
 Segunda Regional B
 Tercera Regional
 Youth
 Liga Nacional Juvenil Group VI
 Divisiones Regionales
 Women's
 Divisiones Regionales

See also
 Spanish football league system
 Aragon official football team

External links
 Official website 

Aragon
Football in Aragon
Sports organizations established in 1922
1922 establishments in Spain